Emoxypine (2-ethyl-6-methyl-3-hydroxypyridine), also known as Mexidol or Mexifin when used as the succinate salt, is an antioxidant actoprotector manufactured in Russia by Pharmasoft Pharmaceuticals. Its chemical structure resembles that of pyridoxine (a type of vitamin B6).

History
Emoxypine was first synthesized by L.D. Smirnov and K.M. Dumayev, then studied and developed in the Institute of Pharmacology, Russian Academy of Medical Sciences and National Scientific Center of Bioactive Substances Safety.

Use
In Russia, emoxypine has a wide range of applications in medical practice. It purportedly exercises anxiolytic, anti-stress, anti-alcohol, anticonvulsant, nootropic, neuroprotective and anti-inflammatory action. Emoxypine presumably improves cerebral blood circulation, inhibits thrombocyte aggregation, lowers cholesterol levels, has cardioprotective and antiatherosclerotic action.
Emoxypine is mainly known in Russia and is used in the form of eye drops as a universal remedy for the treatment of a wide range of eye diseases such as glaucoma, PVD, CSR, etc. At the same time, the effectiveness of the drug for the treatment of the above eye diseases has never been reliably proven by any credible clinical studies.

Mechanism of action
Emoxypine's mechanism of action is believed to be its antioxidant and membrane-protective effects with the following key components:

 Emoxypine inhibits free radical oxidation of biomembrane lipids, reacts to peroxide radicals of lipids primary and hydroxyl radical of peptides.
 Increases the activity of antioxidant enzymes, specifically that of superoxide dismutase, responsible for the formation and consumption of lipid peroxides and active oxygen forms.
 Inhibits free radicals during the synthesis of prostaglandin catalyzed cyclooxygenase and lipoxygenase, increases the correlation prostacyclin/ thromboxane A2 and blocks the leukotriene formation.
 Increases the content of polar fraction of lipids (phosphatidyl serine and phosphatidyl inositol) and reduces the cholesterol/phospholipids ratio which proves its lipid-regulatory properties; shifts structure transition into the low temperature zones, that is provokes the reduction of membrane viscosity and the increase of its fluidity, increases lipid-protein ratio.
 Modulates the activity of membrane-bound enzymes: phosphodiesterase, cyclic nucleotides, adenylate cyclase, aldoreductase, acetylcholinesterase.
 Modulates the receptor complexes of the brain membranes, i.e. benzodiazepine, GABA, acetylcholine receptors by increasing their binding ability.
 Stabilizes biomembranes, i.e. membrane structures of blood cells - erythrocytes and thrombocytes during their haemolysis or mechanical injury accompanied by the formation of free radicals.
 Changes the monoamine level and increases the dopamine content in the brain.

Clinical study
One study determined the effectiveness of emoxypine in 205 patients with clinical manifestations of lumbosacral radiculopathy (LSR). Patients were divided into two groups, and further were divided into subgroups depending on the presence of motor disturbances. All patients received a course of conventional medical treatment and physiotherapy; main group additionally received emoxypine. Thereafter, clinical-neurological control of long-term results of treatment in subgroups of patients was performed. The results showed that the use of emoxypine in the combined therapy of patients with LSR led to significant and persistent reduction of severity of pain syndrome and rapid recovery of function of spinal roots and peripheral nerves compared with conventional therapy.

References

External links

Anxiolytics
Hydroxypyridines
Nootropics
Russian drugs